DWOK (107.9 FM) is a radio station owned by Subic Broadcasting Corporation and operated by Bigwas Stream On-Line Broadcast and Publishing House. Its studios and transmitter are located in Purok Sandiwa, Brgy. Tiniguiban, Puerto Princesa. It also airs a number of programs from OK FM in Olongapo.

References

External links
Facebook page

Radio stations in Puerto Princesa
Radio stations established in 2016